Samborowice may refer to the following places in Poland:
Samborowice, Lower Silesian Voivodeship (south-west Poland)
Samborowice, Silesian Voivodeship (south Poland)